The Lord Mayor of Belfast is the leader and chairperson of Belfast City Council, elected annually from and by the City's 60 councillors. The Lord Mayor also serves as the representative of the city of Belfast, welcoming guests from across the United Kingdom and Ireland.

The current Lord Mayor is Tina Black of Sinn Fein who has been in the position of Lord Mayor since 1 June 2022. The Deputy Lord Mayor is Michelle Kelly of the Alliance Party.

History 

The position that is now the Lord Mayor originated in 1613 in the town's Royal Charter as the Sovereign of Belfast. In 1842, this position was restyled the Mayor of Belfast. In 1892, four years after Belfast was granted city status, the position was given Lord Mayor status, making it one of only three cities on the island of Ireland having a Lord Mayor, the other two being Cork and Dublin. In 1929, it became one of only six cities in the United Kingdom to have a Lord Mayor styled "the Right Honourable". Until 1973 the position was held for three years, when it was reduced to its current term of one year. From 1921 until 1972, the Lord Mayor was automatically entitled to a seat in the Senate of Northern Ireland.

For most of the City's modern history, the position has been held by Unionists, with members of the Ulster Unionist Party holding the post for a total of 61 of the 67 years between 1921 and 1997. The first non-Unionist Lord Mayor since the partition of Ireland in 1921 was David Cook from the Alliance Party who was elected in 1978. The first nationalist Lord Mayor was not appointed until the election of Alban Maginness from the Social Democratic and Labour Party (SDLP) in 1997, while a Sinn Féin Lord Mayor was first elected in 2002. The loss of the Unionist majority on the Council in 1997 has resulted in a greater rotation of the position amongst the parties, which, like other elected positions within the Council such as Committee chairs, is now filled using the D'Hondt system.

Powers and duties 
The Lord's Mayor's role comprises these powers and duties:

 In times of natural disaster the Lord Mayor may direct resources such as Police, Fire and Ambulance as they see fit
 Presiding over meetings of the council and, in the case of equality of votes, the Lord Mayor has a second or casting vote
 Promoting and raising awareness of the council's main objectives and priority issues
 Encouraging and supporting all aspects of life in Belfast by attending civic and public events
 Receiving distinguished visitors to the city
 Acting as host on behalf of the council and the citizens of Belfast at civic functions
 Acting as a spokesperson to the local, national and international media
 Providing an appropriate response on behalf of Belfast at times of local, national and international catastrophe
 Supporting and encouraging charitable and other appeals as appropriate
 Promoting Belfast's business, commercial, cultural and social life
 Promoting Belfast as a place of excellence in which to do business and as a tourist destination.

Deputy Lord Mayor 
The position of Deputy Lord Mayor has a representative role within the city along with the Lord Mayor. When the Lord Mayor is unavailable for whatever reason, it is the responsibility of the Deputy Lord Mayor to carry out the representative functions of the Lord Mayor.

While the Deputy Lord Mayor is in office, they combine their mayoral responsibilities with their responsibilities as a councillor, such as serving on Council Committees.

Monuments

Sovereigns of Belfast (1613–1842) 
The following is a list of Sovereigns of Belfast from the creation of the position in 1613 until it was replaced by the position of Mayor in 1842.

17th century

1613: John Vesey
1614: John Willowbye
1615: James Burr
1616: James Burr
1617: Carew Hart
1618: Carew Hart
1619: George Theaker
1620: George Theaker
1621: No Name
1622: Edward Holmes
1623: Edward Holmes
1624: No Name
1625: No Name
1626: Edward Holmes
1627: Carew Hart
1628: Edward Holmes
1629: No Name
1630: Walter House Crymble
1631: Lewys Thompson
1632: Robert Foster
1633: Thomas Brampton or Brumston
1634: Lewys Thompson
1635: Henry Le Squire
1636: Henry Le Squire
1637: John Wasber
1638: John Leathes, Senior
1639: Henry Le Squire
1640: John Haddock 
1641: Thomas Hamington
1642: Thomas Stephenson
1643: Thomas Theaker
1644: Robert Foster
1645: William Leathes
1646: John Asshe or Ayshe
1647: Hugh Doake
1648: Robert Foster 
1649: George Giles Martin
1650: Thomas Harrington
1651: Thomas Harrington
1652: Thomas Waring
1653: Thomas Waring
1654: Thomas Theaker
1655: John Leathes Junior
1656: Thomas Waring
1657: William Leathes
1658: William Leathes
1659: William Leathes and Francis Meek
1660: Captain Francis Meek
1661: John Rigby
1662: George Macartney
1663: George Macartney
1664: Thomas Waring
1665: Thomas Waring
1666: Edward Raynell
1667: Captain George Macartney
1668: Captain George Macartney
1669: William Warring
1670: William Warring
1671: Thomas Walcott
1672: George Macartney
1673: George Macartney
1674: Hugh Eccles
1675: George Macartney
1676: George Macartney
1677: George Macartney
1678: George Macartney
1679: George Macartney
1680: George Macartney
1681: Francis Tholford
1682: Lewis Thompson
1683: John Hamilton
1684: John Hamilton
1685: Thomas Knox
1686: Captain Robert Leathes
1687: Captain Robert Leathes
1688: Captain Robert Leathes 
1689: Captain Robert Leathes
1690: Captain Robert Leathes
1691: William Lockhart
1692: James Macartney
1693: William Craford
1694: William Craford
1695: Captain Edward Harrison
1696: Lewis Thompson
1697: Arthur Chichester, 3rd Earl of Donegall
1698: David Smith
1699: David Smith

18th century

1700: George Macartney
1701: John Chalmers
1702: David Butle
1703: David Butle
1704: David Butle and George Macartney
1705: George Macartney
1706: George Macartney
1707: George Macartney
1708: George Macartney
1709: Richard Wilson
1710: Roger Haddock
1711: Roger Haddock
1712: Hans Hamilton
1713: Robert Leathes
1714: James Gurner
1715: James Gurner
1716: Henry Ellis
1717: John Carpenter
1718: John Carpenter
1719: Henry Ellis
1720: Robert Le Byrtt
1721: Robert Le Byrtt
1722: Henry Ellis
1723: George Macartney
1724: Major George Macartney and Nathaniel Byrtt
1725: Nathaniel Byrtt
1726: Dr. James Macartney
1727: John Clugstone
1728: John Clugstone
1729: Thomas Banks
1730: John Duff
1731: Arthur Byrtt
1732: John Clugstone
1733: John Clugstone
1734: Robert Le Byrtt
1735: Robert Le Byrtt
1736: Margetson Saunders
1737: Margetson Saunders
1738: Margetson Saunders
1739: Robert Le Byrtt
1740: Robert Le Byrtt
1741: John Duff
1742: John Duff
1743: Robert Le Byrtt
1744: Arthur Byrtt
1745: Arthur Byrtt
1746: Arthur Byrtt
1747: John Duff
1748: Margetson Saunders
1749: George Macartney
1750: George Macartney
1751: George Macartney
1752: Arthur Byrtt
1753: John Duff
1754: Margetson Saunders
1755: Stewart Banks
1756: Stewart Banks
1757: Arthur Byrtt
1758: Stewart Banks
1759: George Macartney
1760: Stephen Havon
1761: James Hamilton
1762: Stewart Banks 
1763: George Macartney
1764: George Macartney
1765: George Macartney
1766: Stewart Banks
1767: George Macartney
1768: George Macartney
1769: James Hamilton
1770: Stephen Havon
1771: Stewart Banks
1772: Sham Thompson
1773: James Lewis
1774: James Lewis
1775: George Black
1776: George Black
1777: James Lewis
1778: Stewart Banks
1779: Samuel Black
1780: Samuel Black
1781: Samuel Black 
1782: George Black
1783: George Black
1784: Samuel Black
1785: George Black
1786: Rev. William Bristow
1787: Rev. William Bristow
1788: Rev. William Bristow
1789: Samuel Black
1790: Rev. William Bristow
1791: Rev. William Bristow
1792: Rev. William Bristow
1793: Rev. William Bristow
1794: Rev. William Bristow
1795: Rev. William Bristow
1796: Rev. William Bristow
1797: John Brown
1798: Rev. William Bristow
1799: John Brown

19th century

1800–1801: John Brown
1802: Arthur Chichester
1803–1806: James Edward May (MP for Belfast, 1801–1814)
1807–1808: Rev. Edward May
1809–1810: James Edward May (MP for Belfast, 1801–1814)
1811: Rev. Edward May
1812–1815: Thomas Verner
1816: Rev. Edward May
1817–1818: Thomas Ludford Stewart
1819–1822: Thomas Verner
1823: John Agnew and Andrew Alexander
1824: Andrew Alexander and John Agnew
1825–1826: John Agnew 
1827: Rev. Lord Edward Chichester
1828–1833: Sir Stephen Edward May (MP for Belfast, 1814–1816)
1834–1840: John Agnew
1841–1842: Thomas Verner, Jun  (Last Sovereign of the Old Corporation)

Mayors of Belfast (1842–1892) 
The following is a list of Mayors of Belfast from the creation of the position in 1842 until it was replaced by the position of Lord Mayor in 1892.

1842–1844: George Dunbar (2 years)
1844–1845: John Dunbar
1845–1846: Andrew Mulholland
1846–1847: John Kane
1847–1848: John Harrison
1848–1849: George Suffern
1849–1850: William Gilliland Johnston
1850–1852: James Sterling (2 years)
1852–1853: Samuel Graeme Fenton
1853–1854: William McGee
1854–1855: Frederick Harry Lewis
1855–1856: Thomas Verner
1856–1859: Samuel Gibson Getty (3 years)
1859–1861: William Ewart (2 years)
1861–1862: Edward Coey
1862–1863: Charles Lanyon
1863–1866: John Lyttle (3 years)
1866–1867: William Mullan
1867–1868: David Taylor
1868–1869: Samuel McCausland
1869–1870: Frederick Harry Lewis
1870–1871: Samuel Browne
1871–1872: Philip Johnston
1872–1873: (Sir) John Savage
1873–1875: James Henderson (2 years)
1875–1876: Thomas Graham Lindsay
1876–1877: Robert Boag
1877–1879: Sir John Preston (2 years)
1879–1881: John Browne (2 years)
1881–1883: Sir Edward Cowan (2 years)
1883–1885: Sir David Taylor (2 years)
1885–1888: Sir Edward Harland, Bt (2 years)
1887–1889: Sir James Horner Haslett (2 years)
1889–1891: Charles C. Connor (2 years)

Source: Belfast City Council

Lord Mayors of Belfast (1892–present) 
The following is a list of Lord Mayors of Belfast since the creation of the position in 1892.

19th century

20th century

21st century

Deputy Lord Mayors

20th century

21st century

See also
Lord Mayor of Dublin
Lord Mayor of Cork

References

External links
 List of Mayors of Belfast Council 1842-1891
 List of Lord Mayors Belfast Council
 Belfast City Council. Lord mayor
 Former Lord Mayors recall chain of events, Belfast Newsletter
 CAIN: The Northern Ireland Senate, 1921-72

 
Belfast
Belfast City Council
Mayors